43P/Wolf–Harrington is a periodic comet discovered on December 22, 1924, by Max Wolf in Heidelberg, Germany. In 2019 it passed within  of Jupiter, which lifted the perihelion point and increased the orbital period to 9 years.

During the 1997 apparition the comet reached an apparent magnitude a little bit brighter than 12.

The comet had an unfavorable apparition in 2010, because during perihelion (closest approach to the Sun), the comet was only 10 degrees from the Sun as seen from Earth. The comet was not more favorably positioned in the sky until mid October 2010.

The comet nucleus is estimated to be 3.6 kilometers in diameter.

References

External links 
 Orbital simulation from JPL (Java) / Horizons Ephemeris
 Elements and Ephemeris for 43P/Wolf–Harrington – Minor Planet Center
 43P/Wolf–Harrington at the Minor Planet Center's Database
 43P/Wolf-Harrington (2010) – Seiichi Yoshida @ aerith.net (with pictures taken by different astronomers around the world)
 43P/Wolf-Harrington on 2011-Apr-13 (mag 17.4N) C. Bell with a 12" (0.3-m) Schmidt-Cassegrain

Periodic comets
0043
Comets in 2016
19241222